Qingdai (青黛) or Qing Dai, a traditional Chinese medicine, is derived from dried leaves and stems of Baphicacanthus cusia (Nees) Bremek., Polygonum tinctorium Ait., or Isatis indigotica Fortune (Fort.).

Qingdai was first recorded in Yaoxinglun.

See also
 Indirubin
 Realgar/Indigo naturalis
 Indigo naturalis
 Qing Dai

References 

Plants used in traditional Chinese medicine